Henry James Passley (died before 1832) was a planter and slave-owner in Jamaica. He owned Rodney Hall plantation in the parish of Portland with John Paton Passley and Richard Brown Passley. He was elected to the House of Assembly of Jamaica in 1820.

References 

Members of the House of Assembly of Jamaica
Planters from the British West Indies
British slave owners
Year of birth missing
1830s deaths
Year of death uncertain
19th-century Jamaican people